There were 3 modern pentathlon events at the 2014 South American Games. This event served as a qualifier 2015 Pan American Games in Toronto, Ontario, Canada.

Medal summary

Medal table

Medalists

References

Results

M
2014
South American Games
Qualification tournaments for the 2015 Pan American Games